Kenneth Radu is a Canadian writer. He was a shortlisted nominee for the Governor General's Award for English-language fiction at the 1988 Governor General's Awards for his short story collection The Cost of Living.

Originally from Windsor, Ontario, he resided in Quebec as an adult, where he taught at John Abbott College in Montreal.

He was a shortlisted nominee for the Books in Canada First Novel Award in 1989 for Distant Relations, and has won the Hugh Maclennan Prize for Fiction in 1989 for Distant Relations and in 1991 for A Private Performance.

He has also served as co-editor of Matrix, a literary magazine devoted to English-language writing in Montreal. He wrote the afterword for the New Canadian Library edition of Yves Beauchemin's novel The Alley Cat.

Works

Novels
Distant Relations (1989)
Home Fires (1992)
Strange and Familiar Places (1999)
Flesh and Blood (2001)
Purest of Human Pleasures (2004)

Short stories
The Cost of Living (1987)
A Private Performance (1990)
Snow Over Judaea (1994)
Sex in Russia (2010)
net worth  (2018)

Poetry
Letter to a Distant Father (1987)
Treading Water (1992)
Romanian Suite (1996)

Memoir
The Devil Is Clever: A Memoir of My Romanian Mother (2004)

References

Living people
Canadian male short story writers
Canadian male novelists
20th-century Canadian poets
Canadian male poets
20th-century Canadian novelists
21st-century Canadian novelists
Writers from Windsor, Ontario
Writers from Montreal
Canadian memoirists
Anglophone Quebec people
Canadian people of Romanian descent
20th-century Canadian short story writers
21st-century Canadian short story writers
20th-century Canadian male writers
1945 births
21st-century Canadian male writers
Canadian male non-fiction writers